Vegetarian bee hoon is a Singaporean noodle dish which comprises vegetarian spring rolls, fried tofu skin, and mock meats made from gluten. Usually, the bee hoon is fried first and put in a large container, when an order is placed, other cooked ingredients are added to the bee hoon.

See also 
Singaporean cuisine
List of noodle dishes

References

Singaporean cuisine
Fried noodles